Koettlitz Névé is a roughly circular névé about  wide at the head of Koettlitz Glacier, Victoria Land, Antarctica. The névé is bounded to the west and south by Mount Talmadge, Mount Rees and Mount Cocks, and to the east by Mount Morning. It was named by the Advisory Committee on Antarctic Names in 1994 in association with Koettlitz Glacier.

References

Snow fields of the Ross Dependency
Landforms of Victoria Land
Scott Coast
Névés of Antarctica